Lists of terrorist incidents in Iraq

 Terrorist incidents in Iraq in 2003
 Terrorist incidents in Iraq in 2004
 Terrorist incidents in Iraq in 2005
 Terrorist incidents in Iraq in 2006
 Terrorist incidents in Iraq in 2007
 Terrorist incidents in Iraq in 2008
 Terrorist incidents in Iraq in 2009
 Terrorist incidents in Iraq in 2010
 Terrorist incidents in Iraq in 2012
 Terrorist incidents in Iraq in 2013
 Terrorist incidents in Iraq in 2014
 Terrorist incidents in Iraq in 2015
 Terrorist incidents in Iraq in 2016
 Terrorist incidents in Iraq in 2017
 Terrorist incidents in Iraq in 2020

 
Iraq